

475001–475100 

|-id=080
| 475080 Jarry ||  || Alfred Jarry (1873–1907), a French poet, writer and dramatist, who is best known for his play Ubu Roi. || 
|}

475101–475200 

|-bgcolor=#f2f2f2
| colspan=4 align=center | 
|}

475201–475300 

|-bgcolor=#f2f2f2
| colspan=4 align=center | 
|}

475301–475400 

|-bgcolor=#f2f2f2
| colspan=4 align=center | 
|}

475401–475500 

|-bgcolor=#f2f2f2
| colspan=4 align=center | 
|}

475501–475600 

|-bgcolor=#f2f2f2
| colspan=4 align=center | 
|}

475601–475700 

|-bgcolor=#f2f2f2
| colspan=4 align=center | 
|}

475701–475800 

|-bgcolor=#f2f2f2
| colspan=4 align=center | 
|}

475801–475900 

|-id=802
| 475802 Zurek ||  || David R. Zurek (born 1966) is an authority on far-ultraviolet variables in dense stellar fields. He is currently the Data Collections Manager in the Department of Astrophysics in the American Museum of Natural History. || 
|}

475901–476000 

|-bgcolor=#f2f2f2
| colspan=4 align=center | 
|}

References 

475001-476000